Alexander Sadebeck (26 June 1843 in Breslau – 9 December 1879 in Hamburg) was a German geologist and mineralogist. He was a brother of botanist Richard Sadebeck (1839–1905).

He studied mineralogy and geology at the University of Berlin as a pupil of Gustav Rose. In 1865 he received his doctorate with a dissertation on Upper Jurassic formations in Pomerania. In 1872 he was appointed professor of mineralogy and geology at the University of Kiel.

In 1873 he published a new edition of Gustav Rose's Elemente der Krystallographie ("Elements of Crystallography"). He was also editor of the section on geology in Karl Klaus von der Decken's Reisen in Ost-Afrika ("Journeys in East Africa"). Furthermore, he was the author of noted works on tetrahedrite, the crystallization of galena, the crystalline forms of chalcopyrite, etc.

Selected works 
 Geognostische Arbeiten im Jahre 1869. In: Zeitschrift der Gesellschaft für Erdkunde zu Berlin. 5th volume. Verlag von Dietrich Reimer, Berlin 1870 – Geognostic works in 1869.
 Gustav Rose’s Elemente der Krystallographie. 3rd edition. Ernst Siegfried Mittler und Sohn, Königliche Hofbuchhandlung, Berlin 1873 – Gustav Rose's Elemente der Krystallographie. 
 Rose-Sadebeck’s Elemente der Krystallographie. Volume 2. Angewandte Krystallographie. Ernst Siegfried Mittler und Sohn, Königliche Hofbuchhandlung, Berlin 1876 – Rose-Sadebeck's Elemente der Krystallographie, volume 2: Applied crystallography. 
 Baron Carl Claus von der Decken’s Reisen in Ostafrika. Volume 3: Scientific results. 3rd section. therein: Geology, edited by Alexander Sadebeck. C. F. Winter’sche Verlagsbuchhandlung, Leipzig und Heidelberg 1879.
A number of his scientific articles were published in the Zeitschrift der Deutschen geologischen Gesellschaft ("Journal of the German Geological Society").

References 

1843 births
1879 deaths
Scientists from Wrocław
Humboldt University of Berlin alumni
Academic staff of the University of Kiel
German mineralogists
19th-century German geologists